Leemon McHenry is a bioethicist and Emeritus Professor of Philosophy at California State University, Northridge, in the United States.  He has taught philosophy at the University of Edinburgh, Old Dominion University, Davidson College, Central Michigan University, Wittenberg University and Loyola Marymount University, and has held visiting research positions at Johns Hopkins University, UCLA and at the Institute for Advanced Studies in the Humanities in the University of Edinburgh.  His research interests center on medical ethics, metaphysics, and philosophy of science.

Education
McHenry received his doctorate from the University of Edinburgh, in Scotland, where he was Vans Dunlop Scholar in Logic and Metaphysics supervised by Professor Timothy L. S. Sprigge. He defended the thesis Experience and relations in the metaphysics of A.N. Whitehead and F.H. Bradley, in `1984 by external examiner, Professor Dorothy Emmet, Cambridge University.

Writings
Much of McHenry's philosophical work focuses on the philosophy of Alfred North Whitehead and process studies.  He has devoted attention to Whitehead's attempt to construct a unified general theory from the revolutionary developments in modern physics.  McHenry has argued that Whitehead's event ontology is a more adequate basis for achieving this unification than a traditional substance metaphysics. His papers on this subject and a book, The Event Universe, investigate the influence of Maxwell's electromagnetic field and Einstein's special theory of relativity on the ontology of events. In this manner he has defended the naturalized and speculative approach to metaphysics as opposed to analytical and linguistic methods that arose in the 20th century.  His main influences include: Alfred North Whitehead, Bertrand Russell, W. V. Quine, Karl Popper, Nicholas Maxwell and Timothy Sprigge.

In medical ethics he has focused attention on scientific integrity in clinical research. He has criticized the corporate takeover of medicine and the corrupting influence of the pharmaceutical industry on medicine. This includes dubious claims about chemical imbalance as a marketing ploy for selling antidepressants, direct-to-consumer advertising of pharmaceuticals, industry-sponsored clinical research, and ghostwriting for medical journals. As an example of the latter, he has written articles about GlaxoSmithKline's study 329 on paroxetine and teenagers, and asked that the ghostwritten article about the trial results be retracted by the journal that published it in 2001. In a broader realm, he has argued that the industry-academic partnerships have worsened university research, created increased opportunities for scientific misconduct, and failed to protect academic freedom. This work falls within a new area of inquiry, agnotology, understood as the study of willful acts to spread confusion and deceit.  

McHenry's work has been translated into Italian, French, Spanish, German, Crotian, and Polish.

In 2007 he became the literary executor to the late Professor Timothy Sprigge.

Publications

Books
 1992, Whitehead and Bradley:  A Comparative Analysis, SUNY Series in Systematic Philosophy, Albany: State University of New York Press.
 1993, Reflections on Philosophy: Introductory Essays, ed. with Frederick Adams, New York: St. Martins Press. (Second edition, 2003, edited with Takaski Yagisawa, New York: Longman)
 2002, British Philosophers: 1800-2000, ed. with P. Dematteis and P. Fosl, London and Detroit: Gale.
 2003, American Philosophers Before 1950, ed. with P. Dematteis, Volume, 270, London and Detroit: Gale.
 2003, American Philosophers, 1950-2000, ed. with P. Dematteis, Volume 279, London and Detroit: Gale.
 2007, Consciousness, Reality and Value: Essays in Honour of T. L. S. Sprigge, ed. with Pierfrancesco Basile, Frankfurt: Ontos Verlag.
 2009, Science and the Pursuit of Wisdom: Studies in the Philosophy of Nicholas Maxwell, (ed), Frankfurt: Ontos Verlag.
 2010, The Importance of Subjectivity: Selected Essays in Metaphysics and Ethics, T. L. S. Sprigge, (ed), Oxford: Oxford University Press. 
 2011, Philosophy: The Classic Readings, (ed) San Diego, CA: University Readers.
 2015, The Event Universe: The Revisionary Metaphysics of Alfred North Whitehead, Edinburgh University Press.
 2020,The Illusion of Evidence-Based Medicine: Exposing the Crisis of Credibility in Clinical Research, with Jon Jureidini, Adelaide: Wakefield Press.

Selected Articles
Philosophy

1995, "Quine's Pragmatic Ontology," The Journal of Speculative Philosophy, 9/2, pp. 147–158.
 1996, "Descriptive and Revisionary Theories of Events", Process Studies, 25, p. 90-103; translated into Italian by Riccardo Manzotti as “Teorie Descrittive e Revisioniste degli Eventi”, Nóema, 11, 2020, pp. 19–31.  
1997,"Quine and Whitehead: Ontology and Methodology," Process Studies, The Forum, 26, pp. 2–12. (Reply: W. V. Quine, "Response to Leemon McHenry" Process Studies, The Forum, 26, pp. 13–14; reprinted in Process and Analysis: Whitehead, Hartshorne and the Analytic Tradition, ed by George Shields, State University of New York Press, 2003, pp. 171–173, and Quine in Dialogue, ed by Dagfinn Føllesdal and Douglas Quine, Harvard University Press, 2008, pp. 257–58.)
 2004, "The Case Against Catholicism: A Historical and Philosophical Analysis," American Rationalist, Part 1, July/August, pp. 8–10, Part 2, September/October, pp. 6–10.
 2007, "Maxwell's Field and Whitehead's Events: The Adventure of a Revolutionary Idea" in Subjectivity, Process, and Rationality edited by Michel Weber and P. Basile, Frankfurt: Ontos Verlag.
2007, "Commercial Influences on the Pursuit of Wisdom," London Review of Education, vol. 5, no 2, p. 131-142; translated into Spanish by Antoni Furió as “La mercantilización del saber: Influencias mercantiles en la búsqueda del conocimiento,” Pasajes: Revista de Pensamiento Contemporaneo, 33, 2010, pp. 31–41.
2009, "Popper and Maxwell on Scientific Progress," Science and the Pursuit of Wisdom: Studies in the Philosophy of Nicholas Maxwell, ed. by L. McHenry, Frankfurt: Ontos Verlag, pp. 233–248.
2010, "Sprigge's Ontology of Consciousness," The Metaphysics of Consciousness ed by P. Basile, J. Kiverstein,P. Phemister, Cambridge: Cambridge University Press, pp. 5–20.
2011, "The Multiverse Conjecture: Whitehead’s Cosmic Epochs and Contemporary Cosmology” Process Studies 40.1, pp. 5–25.

2016, "Analytical Critiques of Whitehead's Metaphysics," with George Sheilds, The Journal of the American Philosophical Association, 2, pp. 483–503.
2017, "Whitehead and Russell on the Analysis of Matter," The Review of Metaphysics, 71, pp. 321–342

Medicine and bioethics

 2005, "On the Origin of Great Ideas:  Science in the Age of Big Pharma," Hastings Center Report, vol 35, no 6, p 17–19.
 2006, "Ethical Issues in Psychopharmacology", Journal of Medical Ethics vol 32, p 405–410.
2008, "Clinical Trials and Drug Promotion: Selective Reporting of Study 329," with Jon N. Jureidini and Peter R. Mansfield, International Journal of Risk & Safety in Medicine, vol. 20, pp. 73–81.
2008, "Industry-Sponsored Ghostwriting in Clinical Reporting: A Case Study," with Jon N. Jureidini, Accountability in Research, vol. 15, no. 3, pp. 152–167
2008, “Biomedical Research and Corporate Interests: A Question of Academic Freedom,” Mens Sana Monographs, 6, pp. 146–156.
2010, "Of Sophists and Spin-Doctors: Industry-Sponsored Ghostwriting and the Crisis of Academic Medicine," Mens Sana Monographs, 8, pp. 129–145.
2012, "On the Proposed Changes to the Credibility Gap in Industry-Supported Biomedical Research: A Critical Evaluation” with Jon N.Jureidini, Ethical Human Psychology & Psychiatry 14/3, pp. 156–161.
2012, “The Paroxetine 352 Bipolar Trial: A Study in Medical Ghostwriting,” with Jay D. Amsterdam, International Journal of Risk and Safety in Medicine 24/4, pp. 221–231.
2014, “Blood Money: Bayer’s Inventory of HIV Contaminated Blood Products and third World Hemophiliacs,” with Mellad M. Khoshnood, Accountability in Research 21/6, pp. 389–400.
2016, “The Citalopram CIT-MD-18 Pediatric Depression Trial: A Deconstruction of Medical Ghostwriting, Data Manipulation and Academic Malfeasance,” with Jay D. Amsterdam and Jon N. Jureidini, International Journal of Risk & Safety in Medicine, 28, pp. 33–43.
2017, "Industry-Corrupted Psychiatric Trials," with Jay D. Amsterdam and Jon N. Jureidini, Psychiatra Polska 51(6), pp. 993–1008.
2018, "The Monsanto Papers: Poisoning the Scientific Well," International Journal of Risk & Safety in Medicine 29 (3-4), pp. 193–205.
2022, "The Illusion of Evidence Based Medicine," with Jon Jureidini, British Medical Journal 376, pp. 702–03.

See also
PhilPeople https://philpeople.org/profiles/leemon-mchenry
Academia.edu https://independent.academia.edu/LeemonMcHenry

 American philosophy
 List of American philosophers
George Austin McHenry

References

External links
 CSUN.edu - Leemon McHenry's CSUN faculty homepage, Philosophy Department
Interview with Leemon McHenry about his forthcoming book, The Event Universe
 AnthonyFlood.com - 'A review of Leemon McHenry,  Whitehead and Bradley: A Comparative Analysis', Lewis S. Ford
 Timothy Sprigge
 http://www.whiteheadresearch.com/about/intl-board.shtml—Whitehead Research Institute
 http://www.philosophy.ed.ac.uk—University of Edinburgh Philosophy Department

American philosophers
Bioethicists
American non-fiction writers
1956 births
Living people
Alumni of the University of Edinburgh
Academics of the University of Edinburgh